Veľká Lehota is a village and municipality in the Žarnovica District, Banská Bystrica Region in Slovakia.

External links
https://web.archive.org/web/20080111223415/http://www.statistics.sk/mosmis/eng/run.html 

Villages and municipalities in Žarnovica District